In enzymology, a (+)-abscisic acid 8'-hydroxylase is an enzyme that catalyzes the chemical reaction

(+)-abscisate + NADPH + H + O  8'-hydroxyabscisate + NADP + HO

The four substrates of this enzyme are (+)-abscisate, NADPH, H, and O, whereas its three products are 8'-hydroxy-abscisate, NADP, and HO.

This enzyme belongs to the family of oxidoreductases, to be specific those acting on paired donors, with O as oxidant and incorporation or reduction of oxygen. The oxygen incorporated need not be derived from O with NADH or NADPH as one donor, and incorporation of one atom of oxygen into the other donor. This enzyme participates in carotenoid biosynthesis.

Nomenclature 

The systematic name of this enzyme class is abscisate,NADPH:oxygen oxidoreductase (8'-hydroxylating). Other names in common use include
 (+)-ABA 8'-hydroxylase and
 ABA 8'-hydroxylase.

References

 
 

EC 1.14.13
NADPH-dependent enzymes
Enzymes of unknown structure